Raja Shrimant Venkatarao Ramchandrarao Ghorpade (10 July 1892 – 24 July 1927) was the ruler of the princely state of Sandur from 1892 to 1927. The state was administered by a council of regency till 1913 when he was invested with full ruling powers. Venkata Rao was a recipient of the 1903 Delhi Durbar and 1911 Delhi Durbar medals. On his death in 1927 and in the absence of a male heir, Venkata Rao was succeeded as ruler by his cousin Yeshwantrao Ghorpade.

1892 births
1927 deaths
Indian monarchs